The women's individual competition of the triathlon events at the 2015 Pan American Games was held on July 11 at the Ontario Place West Channel in Toronto, Ontario, Canada. The defending Pan American Games champion is Sarah Haskins of the United States.

The Pan American Games triathlon contains three components; a  swim,  cycle, and a  run.

The winner Barbara Riveros of Chile qualified to compete in the triathlon competitions at the 2016 Summer Olympics in Rio de Janeiro, Brazil.

Schedule
All times are Eastern Daylight Time (UTC-4).

Results

Race
35 competitors from 13 countries were scheduled to compete.

References

Triathlon at the 2015 Pan American Games